Mastigoteuthis schmidti is a species of whip-lash squid.

References
Degner, E. 1925. Cephalopoda. Report on the Danish Oceanographical Expeditions 1908-10 to the Mediterranean and Adjacent Seas 2(9): 1-94.

Specific

External links

Tree of Life web project: Mastigoteuthis schmidti

Mastigoteuthis
Molluscs described in 1925